Amari Hotels and Resorts is a Thai-based hotel and resort chain owned by ONYX Hospitality Group, operating a network of properties in urban and resort destinations throughout Thailand and Asia. Amari is the centrepiece of ONYX Hospitality Group’s portfolio of brands, reflecting the warmth and energy of an evolving modern Asia. Amari’s network of properties spans Thailand and beyond, from scenic seaside locations to vibrant urban settings including Hua Hin, Pattaya, Samui, Phuket, Krabi, Bangkok, Dhaka, the Maldives, Johor Bahru, and  Vang Vieng in Laos. .

Proud of its Asian roots, Amari creates memorable experiences that embody the spirit of local culture enhanced by the renowned traditions of Asian hospitality. Every Amari property shares the flavours and texture of its setting. So, whether travelling for business or leisure, guests will discover contemporary spaces alive with energy and zesty menus designed to be shared with family and friends.

History

Founded by the parent company Italthai in Thailand in 1965, under Siam Lodge Hotel Group, it later became Amari Hotels and Resorts Company Limited in 1992. 

In April 1995 Amari formed a joined venture with Philippine Public Estates Authority to form a reclamation project called Freedom Islands in the Philippines and was approved by then-President Fidel V. Ramos on June the same year. It never came to fruition as it was marred by allegations of corruption.

In 2010, Amari Hotels and Resorts announced a new corporate structure with the creation of ONYX Hospitality Group, as a hotel management company. This restructure has allowed the company to pursue its expansion plans in moving beyond Thailand. 

ONYX Hospitality Group has a range of hotels, resorts, serviced apartments and spa brands including Amari, Shama, OZO, The Saffron Collection and Breeze Spa.

In 2010, the Amari brand was re-launched with a new brand identity ‘Colours and Rhythms’. 

In 2020, the brand launches a refreshed brand identity 'Brighten Your World' to celebrate contemporary Thainess; food, arts, design, architecture, wellness, festivities and fun through its service, product design, brand signatures and experiences.

The Amari culture 

 Celebrating contemporary culture: Guests are provided with a revitalised view of contemporary local culture
 International standards: Reliable quality and consistent service that can be trusted
 Straight from the heart: Down-to-earth service from genuine and caring team members
 Vibrant spaces: Specially designed spaces, activities, food & beverages so guests can come together

Hotels 
As of May 2020, Amari has 15 properties in Thailand, Laos, Malaysia, Bangladesh and Maldives.

Upcoming Hotels

Dancing with the Stars 

In January 2013, BBC Worldwide Ltd. partnered with Amari to bring television show Dancing with the Stars to Thailand. The premier of Dancing with the Stars (Thailand) aired on 7 January 2013 and ran for a total of 7 x 90-minute episodes.

References

External links
Amari official website

Hospitality companies of Thailand
1965 establishments in Thailand
Companies based in Bangkok
Hotel chains in Thailand